The 2020–21 HockeyAllsvenskan season was the 16th season that the second tier of Swedish ice hockey operated under that name. The series consisted of 14 teams playing a regular season in which each team played each other team four times, twice at home and twice away. This is followed by a series of promotion and relegation tournaments, with the teams finishing first through tenth participating in promotion playoffs, and the teams finishing 13th and 14th forced to requalify to avoid relegation to the Hockeyettan.

Because of the COVID-19 pandemic no promotion took place after the previous season; Karlskrona HK were however relegated after being denied their mandatory elite license and Väsby IK HK were promoted in their place.

Participating teams

Note 1: Väsby played their final home game of the regular season against Almtuna, in Almtuna's home arena.

Note 2: Björklöven played one home game in Vännäs ishall.

Regular season

Standings

Statistics

Scoring leaders

The following shows the top ten players who led the league in points, at the conclusion of matches played on 14 March 2021. If two or more skaters are tied (i.e. same number of points, goals and played games), all of the tied skaters are shown.

Leading goaltenders
The following shows the top ten goaltenders who led the league in goals against average, provided that they have played at least 40% of their team's minutes, at the conclusion of matches played on 14 March 2021.

Post-season

Playoff bracket

Eighth-finals
Teams 7–10 from the regular season played best-of-three playoff series, where team 7 faced team 10 and team 8 faced team 9. In each series the higher-seeded team had home-ice advantage, playing at home for game 1 (plus 3 if necessary) while the lower-seeded team played at home for game 2. The winners moved on to the quarterfinals.

Västerås IK vs. Almtuna IS

Tingsryds AIF vs. AIK

Quarterfinals
Teams 1–6 from the regular season, along with the winners of the eighth-finals, played best-of-five series, with the winners moving on to the semifinals. In each series the higher-seeded team had home-ice advantage, playing at home for games 1 and 2 (plus 5 if necessary) while the lower-seeded team played at home for game 3 (plus 4 if necessary). The higher-seeded half of the teams chose their opponents, with the highest-seeded remaining team choosing at each step.

Timrå IK vs. AIK

BIK Karlskoga vs. Västerås IK

IF Björklöven vs. Mora IK

Södertälje SK vs. Västerviks IK

Semifinals
The winners of the quarterfinals play best-of-seven series, with the winners moving on to the Finals. The highest-seeded team chose whether to play the second-lowest seed or the lowest seed. In each series the higher-seeded team has home-ice advantage, playing at home for games 1 and 2 (plus 5 and 7 if necessary) while the lower-seeded team plays at home for games 3 and 4 (plus 6 if necessary).

Timrå IK vs. Västerviks IK

BIK Karlskoga vs. IF Björklöven

Finals
The winners of the semifinals played a best-of-seven series, with the winner promoted to the Swedish Hockey League (SHL). The higher-seeded team had home-ice advantage, playing at home for games 1 and 2 (plus 5 and 7 if necessary) while the lower-seeded team played at home for games 3 and 4 (plus 6 if necessary).

Play Out
Teams 13 and 14 from the regular season played a best-of-five series, with the winner remaining in HockeyAllsvenskan and the loser relegated to Hockeyettan. The higher-seeded team had home-ice advantage, playing at home for games 1 and 2 (plus 5 if necessary) while the lower-seeded team played at home for game 3 (plus 4 if necessary).

Väsby IK HK vs. Kristianstads IK

References

Sweden
Allsvenskan
HockeyAllsvenskan seasons